Obed Ansah (born November 2, 1986) is a Ghanaian football player. He currently plays for Young Fellows Juventus. He previously played for Heart of Oak SC and Heart of Lions F.C. in the Ghana Premier League. After a period of inactivity, he announced his desire to return to football in 2020.

References

Living people
Ghanaian footballers
1986 births
Footballers from Accra
Association football midfielders
Accra Hearts of Oak S.C. players
SC Young Fellows Juventus players